Choerotricha is a genus of tussock moths in the family Erebidae. The genus was described by Felder in 1874.

Species
The following species are included in the genus.
Choerotricha atrosquamata Walker, 1866
Choerotricha biflava Holloway, 1976
Choerotricha indistincta Rothschild, 1920

References

Lymantriinae
Moth genera